Shane Thomas Bertsch (born March 30, 1970) is an American professional golfer who has played on the PGA Tour.

Bertsch was born in Denver, Colorado. He turned professional in 1994.

Bertsch has won twice on the Nationwide Tour, once in 2000 and once in 2005. His best PGA Tour finish was a tie for fifth at the 1996 Greater Vancouver Open.

Bertsch was once a top-tier tennis player, but gave up the game for good after losing to future world number-one Andre Agassi in 1994.

Bertsch barely missed retaining full tour privileges for 2009, finished 126th on the money list. He secured a tour card for 2010 by finishing 15th in qualifying school.

In August 2020, Bertsch won in his second PGA Tour Champions start. He beat Glen Day, Bernhard Langer and Kenny Perry with an eagle at the first sudden-death playoff hole.

Professional wins (8)

Web.com Tour wins (3)

*Note: The 2005 BMW Charity Pro-Am at The Cliffs was shortened to 54 holes due to weather.

Web.com Tour playoff record (0–2)

Other wins (3)
1994 Southwest Kansas Pro-Am
1998 Colorado Open
2020 Westminster Senior Open

PGA Tour Champions wins (1)

PGA Tour Champions playoff record (1–0)

Results in major championships

CUT = missed the half-way cut
Note: Bertsch only played in the U.S. Open.

Results in The Players Championship

CUT = missed the half-way cut

See also
1995 PGA Tour Qualifying School graduates
1996 PGA Tour Qualifying School graduates
2005 Nationwide Tour graduates
2009 PGA Tour Qualifying School graduates
2015 Web.com Tour Finals graduates

References

External links

American male golfers
Texas A&M Aggies men's golfers
PGA Tour golfers
PGA Tour Champions golfers
Korn Ferry Tour graduates
Golfers from Denver
1970 births
Living people